The Diocese of Getafe  is a Roman Catholic ecclesiastical territory in Spain, part of the Archdiocese of Madrid. The seat is in the city of Getafe, in the Getafe Cathedral. 

It was established on July 23, 1991, from the Roman Catholic Archdiocese of Madrid. The current bishop is Ginés García Beltrán. The former bishop, Joaquín María López de Andújar y Cánovas del Castillo, resigned in 2017 when becoming 75 years old, as the Canon law of the Catholic Church prescribes.

See also
Roman Catholicism in Spain

References

External links
 Official website
 GCatholic.org 
 Catholic Hierarchy 

Roman Catholic dioceses in Spain
Roman Catholic dioceses established in 1991
Roman Catholic dioceses and prelatures established in the 20th century
1991 establishments in Spain